Eleanor and Franklin may refer to:

 Eleanor and Franklin (book), 1971 biography by Joseph P. Lash
 Eleanor: The Years Alone, 1972 companion volume to the previous biography
 Eleanor and Franklin (miniseries), 1976 television miniseries based on the biography
 Eleanor and Franklin: The White House Years, 1977 made-for-television film and sequel to the miniseries